The Electoral division of Gordon was an electoral division in the Tasmanian Legislative Council of Australia. It existed from 1899 to 1999, when it was abolished since the Council was reduced from 19 to 15 seats. It took its name from the Gordon River.

Members

See also
Tasmanian Legislative Council electoral divisions

References
Past election results for Gordon

Former electoral districts of Tasmania
1999 disestablishments in Australia